Käthe Gold (11 February 1907 – 11 October 1997) was an Austrian actress.

Born in Vienna, she trained in that city as an actress and then went to Bern, Breslau (now Wrocław) and Munich. In 1932 she went to Berlin, where she remained until 1944. It was during those years that she had her greatest successes on the stage in plays such as Goethe's Faust (Gretchen), Shakespeare's Hamlet (Ophelia), and Ibsen's A Doll's House (Nora).

In 1944, Gold went to Zurich, and in 1947 she returned to Vienna, where she played at the Burgtheater.

Gold's stage career prevented her from appearing in many movies. Of the few films in which she did act, Amphitryon (1935, playing Alkmene), The Girl from Barnhelm (1940) and, after the war, Rose Bernd (1957) and Karl May (a 1976 biopic about Karl May) are notable. On TV she played Linda opposite Heinz Rühmann in a 1968 German language version of Arthur Miller's Death of a Salesman. She also had two guest appearances in the TV series, Der Kommissar.

Käthe Gold died in her native Vienna at the age of 90.

Selected filmography
 Amphitryon (1935)
 The Valley of Love (1935)
 Another World (1937)
 The Girl from Barnhelm (1940)
 Eyes of Love (1951)
 Palace Hotel (1952)
 Rose Bernd (1957)
  (1968, TV film)
 Karl May (1974)

Decorations and awards
 1936: State actress in Berlin
 1952: Chamber actress in Vienna
 1960: Hans Reinhart Ring
 1963: Austrian Cross of Honour for Science and Art
 1965: Josef Kainz Medal for the presentation of Mistress Page in The Merry Wives of Windsor at the Burgtheater
 1967: Gold Medal of Vienna
 1977: Grand Silver Medal for Services to the Republic of Austria
 1982: Honorary Ring of Vienna
 1988: Gold Film Award for many years of excellent work in the German film industry

References

External links

Photographs of Käthe Gold

1907 births
1997 deaths
Actresses from Vienna
Austrian stage actresses
Austrian film actresses
Austrian television actresses
Recipients of the Austrian Cross of Honour for Science and Art
Recipients of the Grand Decoration for Services to the Republic of Austria
20th-century Austrian actresses